The Weltmuseum Wien (former Museum of Ethnology) in Vienna is the largest anthropological museum in Austria, established in 1876. It currently resides in the Hofburg Imperial Palace and houses more than 400,000 ethnographical and archaeological objects from Asia, Africa, Oceania, and America. Since November 2014 the museum was closed due to renovation and was reopened on the 25th of October 2017.

Collections 

The museum's collections comprise more than 200,000 ethnographic objects, 100,000 photographs and 146,000 printed works from all over the world.
Important collections include Mexican artifacts, such as a unique Aztec feathered headdress; part of James Cook's collection of Polynesian and Northwest Coast art (purchased in 1806); numerous Benin bronzes; the collection of Charles von Hügel from India, Southeast Asia, and China; collections from the Austrian Brazil Expedition; artifacts collected during the circumnavigation of the globe by the SMS Novara; and two of the remaining rongorongo tablets.

The museum's most famous piece is a feathered headdress which tradition holds belonged to Moctezuma II, the Aztec emperor at the time of the Spanish Conquest. This has created friction between the Mexican and the Austrian governments. Originally taken as war booty by the Spanish in the 16th century, Austria acquired it from France in 1880.

Departments 

Sub-Saharan Africa 
North Africa, Middle East, Central Asia and Siberia 
East Asia: China, Korea, Japan 
Insular Southeast Asia 
South Asia, Southeast Asia, Himalayas 
Oceania and Australia 
North and Central America 
South America 
Photo Collection

History

Ethnographic collections in Austria before 1876  
Early ethnographic collections in Austria date back to the 16th century. The so-called “Kunst- und Wunderkammern“ comprised many objects, such as the collection by Ferdinand II, Archduke of Austria, which was stored in Ambras Castle in Innsbruck. In the course of the Coalition Wars these objects were transferred to Vienna. Other important collections were assembled by numerous explorers and travellers, such as Johann Natterer, who accompanied the Austrian Brazil Expedition from 1817 to 1835, or the scientists of the Austrian frigate ”SMS Novara”

k.u.k. Monarchy 
In 1876 the Imperial and Royal Court Museum of Natural History – predecessor of the Museum of Ethnology – was established, consisting of five departments. In the years following Archduke Franz Ferdinand of Austria’s journey round the world (1892/93), the collections of the Anthropological-Ethnographic Department were separated from the museum and installed in the Hofburg Imperial Palace, combined with the Archduke’s collection, which comprised more than 14,000 objects and around 1,100 photographs.  This “Museum of Ethnology” was opened on 28 May 1928. In the postwar period extensive reconstruction works were undertaken. The museum also presented numerous temporary exhibitions at two permanent outposts – Schloss Matzen and the Gaming Charterhouse.

From Museum of Ethnology to "Weltmuseum Wien"
In the 1990s and the early years of the new millennium a comprehensive renovation of the museum became necessary. Amongst other things, the cellars were adapted to depots, galleries were renovated and additional office rooms were built.  In the course of the semi-privatisation of Austria's federal museums, the museum was incorporated into the museum group KHM-Museumsverband in 2001.  In April 2013 the museum was renamed as Weltmuseum Wien. November 2014 the museum closed for renovation, in February 2015 the ground-breaking ceremony took place. The museum re-opened on October 25, 2017, with 14 galleries and 5 temporary exhibitions.

See also
Xokonoschtletl Gómora — Mexican activist who struggled for the return of Montezuma's headdress housed at the museum.

References

External links

 

Ethnology
Vienna
Art museums and galleries in Austria
Buildings and structures in Innere Stadt
Museums established in 1876
1876 establishments in Austria
Asian art museums in Austria
Kunsthistorisches Museum
19th-century architecture in Austria